Amorphoscelis parva is a species of praying mantis native to Sumba.

See also
List of mantis genera and species

References

Amorphoscelis
Arthropods of Indonesia
Insects described  in 1952